The Internet in Portugal achieved a penetration rate of about 64% of the population in 2012. With an average peak Internet access speed of 34.5 megabits per second, Portugal stood seventeenth on the list of countries with the fastest Internet access.

Status
 Internet users: 6.9 million users, 48th in the world; 64.0% of the population, 57th in the world (2012).
 Fixed broadband: 2.4 million subscribers, 34th in the world; 22.3% of the population, 43rd in the world (2012) 	
 Mobile broadband: 3.5 million subscribers, 47th in the world; 32.5% of the population, 52nd in the world (2012)
 Internet hosts: 3.7 million hosts, 28th in the world (2012)
 IPv4: 5,833,504 addresses allocated, 0.1% of the world total; 541 IPv4 addresses per 1000 persons (2012)
 Domain name: .pt

ADSL2+ and FTTx

ADSL service has been available in Portugal since 2000, however it was not until 2002 that the service started to see wide acceptance from the general public, mainly due to increased competition from service providers, which helped to level prices. Market penetration in Portugal is around 50% although Portugal has the distinction of being one of the few European countries to have coverage in virtually the entire territory.

There are several service providers offering ADSL, fiber and wireless services in Portugal to the residential and the professional markets. The majority of the residential market is split between the two larger operators: Portugal Telecom and Sonae.

The current maximum speed for home Internet plans in Portugal is 1 Gbit/s, available on special request, and 360 Mbit/s is widely available together with television and telephone services.

Portugal Telecom

A former monopoly, Portugal Telecom is still the largest telecommunications company in the country. Due to its previous monopoly status its copper landline infrastructure covers all territory, making it the only operator that can offer direct service anywhere in the country. Portugal Telecom uses different brands to segment their ADSL service, among others SAPO for the residential market and Telepac for the small business market. In November 2006 Portugal Telecom announced their ADSL2+ service, adding a 24 Mbit/s speed grade service to their market offer and effectively catching up to competitor Sonaecom that had been offering ADSL2+ speed grades for several months. Portugal Telecom was also the first to deploy fiber in the country, being that ZON, Vodafone and Sonae followed with their deployment after being denied access to Portugal Telecom's infrastructure.

Sonae

Sonaecom started operations in 1999, soon after the government opened the telecommunications market to competition. The company started by renting Portugal Telecom's lines in order to offer their voice service to customers, but soon started laying their own infrastructure and can now offer direct service in the main metropolitan areas. Sonaecom also uses different brands to segment their ADSL offer, these include Optimus Clix for the residential market and Novis enabling the company to offer Triple Play services to customers in select areas. Taking advantage of the increased bandwidth provided by their ADSL2+ network, Sonaecom announced in June 2006 the launch of their IPTV service, SmartTV.

Other ADSL and fiber providers
 Vodafone
 ZON Multimédia

Cable

Cable service providers
 Cabovisão
 ZON Multimédia

Internet censorship and surveillance
Internet access in Portugal is not restricted. There are neither government restrictions on access to the Internet nor reports that the government monitors e-mail or Internet chat rooms without appropriate legal authority. The constitution and law provide for freedom of speech and press, and the government generally respects these rights in practice. An independent press, an effective judiciary, and a functioning democratic political system combine to ensure freedom of speech and press. The law criminalizes the denigration of ethnic or religious minorities and the engagement in offensive practices such as Holocaust denial. Prison sentences for these crimes run between six months to eight years. The constitution and law prohibit arbitrary interference with privacy, family, home, or correspondence, and the government generally respected these prohibitions in practice, except in more recent years (see below).

The website Tugaleaks, which since December 2010 aims to serve as Portugal's version of WikiLeaks, had its bank account for donations arbitrarily closed on 13 July 2012 with no official communication. Tugaleaks contributors were finally told the account had been closed for its involvement in money laundering and terrorist financing.

As of March 2015, Portuguese ISPs have been ordered to block The Pirate Bay and many of its proxies by a court order, following the European trend, after a lawsuit brought by the Association for Copyright Management, Producers and Publishers (GEDIPE). This is the first time ever a website is blocked by ISPs in Portugal.

In July 2015 the Ministry of Culture announced the signed a memorandum between its own General Inspection of Cultural Activities (IGAC), the Portuguese Association of Telecommunication Operators (APRITEL), various rightsholder groups, the body responsible for administering Portugal’s .PT domain and representatives from the advertising industry to block any website they deemed appropriate. These measures have resulted on thousands of websites blocked under the charges of copyright infringement and gambling. One notable example of blocked copyrighted materials are internet databases that publish copyrighted scientific literature, such as LibGen. Such databases are often the only practical source of academic publications for scientists, the public and universities who can't afford subscription/licensing fees for scientific journals.

See also
 Associação DNS.PT, DNS.PT Association, a non-profit operator of the .pt domain

References

External links 
 DNS.PT Association, official website, operator of the .pt domain
 ZON Optimus
 Portugal Telecom
 Sonae
 Vodafone
 Portugal Internet, Internet service for travelers that are planning a short stay in Portugal